Now I Am Rich (Spanish: Ahora soy rico) is a 1952 Mexican drama film directed by Rogelio A. González and starring Pedro Infante, Marga López and Antonio Aguilar.

The film's art direction was by Jorge Fernández.

Main cast 
 Pedro Infante as Pedro González
 Marga López as Marga
 Antonio Aguilar as Tony Merino
 Irma Dorantes as Chiqui
 Eduardo Alcaraz as Dr. Velasco
 Arturo Soto Rangel as Zapatero
 Gilberto González as Damián
 Gloria Mestre as Salomé
 Antonio R. Frausto as Tachito
 Carlos Riquelme as Doctor

References

Bibliography 
 Amador, María Luisa. Cartelera cinematográfica, 1950-1959. UNAM, 1985.

External links 
 

1952 films
1952 drama films
Mexican drama films
1950s Spanish-language films
Films directed by Rogelio A. González
Films scored by Manuel Esperón
Mexican black-and-white films
1950s Mexican films